Sony DSC may refer to:

Sony Cyber-shot, family of fixed-lens digital compact cameras by Sony
Sony SmartShot, family of lens-style digital cameras by Sony
SONY DSC, Exif data of some Sony Cyber-shot digital cameras